The Washington Capitals are an American professional ice hockey team based in Washington, D.C. The Capitals play in the Metropolitan Division of the Eastern Conference in the National Hockey League (NHL). The team joined the NHL in 1974 as an expansion team and won their first Eastern Conference championship in 1998. The Capitals have played their home games at the Capital One Arena, formerly known as the MCI Center and Verizon Center, since 1997. The Capitals are owned by Ted Leonsis, and Brian MacLellan is their general manager.

There have been 18 head coaches for the Capitals franchise. The franchise's first head coach was Jim Anderson, who coached for less than a season. Bryan Murray is the franchise's all-time leader for the most regular-season games coached (672), the most regular-season game wins (343), the most regular-season points (769), the most playoff games coached (53), and the most playoff-game wins (24). Murray's brother, Terry, has also coached the Capitals, right after his brother Bryan. Roger Crozier, who only coached one game for the Capitals, is the franchise's all-time leader for the least regular-season game points (0). Ron Wilson won the Prince of Wales Trophy with the Capitals, but lost the 1998 Stanley Cup Finals against the Detroit Red Wings. Bryan Murray, Bruce Boudreau and Barry Trotz are the only Capitals coaches to have won the Jack Adams Award. None of the Capitals coaches have been elected into the Hockey Hall of Fame as a builder. Anderson, Danny Belisle, Gary Green, Crozier, Glen Hanlon, Dale Hunter and Adam Oates have spent their entire NHL head coaching careers with the Capitals.

Dale Hunter, who replaced Boudreau on November 28, 2011, resigned on May 14, 2012, citing personal reasons. Adam Oates was named the Capitals' 16th head coach on June 26, 2012. After having missed the playoffs for the second time in seven years, the Washington Capitals hired former Nashville Predators coach Barry Trotz on May 26, 2014. Trotz resigned as head coach in June 2018, after winning the Stanley Cup for the first time in the franchise's history. Later that same month, the team promoted Todd Reirden, a Capitals assistant coach since 2014, to the head coaching position.

Key

Coaches

Note: Statistics are correct through the end of the 2021–22 NHL season.

Notes
 A running total of the number of coaches of the Capitals. Thus, any coach who has two or more separate terms as head coach is only counted once.
 Since the start of the 2005–06 season, the NHL has instituted a penalty shootout for regular season games that remained tied after a five-minute overtime period instead of ending in a tie.
 Each year is linked to an article about that particular NHL season.

References
General

Specific

Washington Capitals coaches
Washington Capitals head coaches
Head coaches